The Movement for National Development (or LZHK) is a centre-right political party in Albania. The Movement for National Development was founded in 2004 as a five party coalition under the spiritual leadership of Leka I Zogu, King of the Albanians. The Movement for National Development entered the 2005 elections and won 47,967 votes, the result failed to achieve the required 4% for a coalition to enter parliament, falling short with 3,5% of the vote.

In October 2005 Dashamir Shehi registered the movement as a political party, and has since maintained an alliance with the  Democratic Party.

In the 27th Legislature of Albania, LZHK held 1 from 140 seats in the Albanian parliament, which is the acting leader Dashamir Shehi. The party returned to parliament after the 2021 Albanian parliamentary election, winning 1 seat, contesting on the list of the Democratic Party.

References

Centrist parties in Albania
Liberal parties in Albania
Monarchist parties
Monarchist parties in Albania
Political parties in Albania
Political parties established in 2004
2004 establishments in Albania